Lathyrus littoralis is a species of wild pea known by the common name silky beach pea. It is native to the coastline of western North America from British Columbia to California. It is a resident of beaches and dunes.

This is a perennial herb which grows a patch of hairy gray-green stems along the sandy ground or slightly upright. The woolly leaves are made up of several oval or oblong scoop-shaped leaflets. There are small, tough tendrils but the plant does not use them to climb. The plant produces dense inflorescences of several flowers each one to two centimeters wide. Each flower is bicolored in dark-veined deep pink and white. The fruit is a dehiscent oval-shaped hairy legume pod. It blooms from late spring to early summer.

The roots are edible.

References

External links
 Calflora Database: Lathyrus littoralis (Beach pea,  Silky beach pea)
 Jepson Manual eFlora (TJM2) treatment of Lathyrus littoralis
USDA Plants Profile for Lathyrus littoralis
UC CalPhotos gallery:  Lathyrus littoralis

littoralis
Endemic flora of California
Vines
Flora without expected TNC conservation status